The black-spotted kangaroo lizard or black-patched kangaroo lizard (Otocryptis nigristigma), is a small, ground dwelling agamid lizard endemic to Sri Lanka.

References

External links
 https://www.flickr.com/photos/kookr/4580134066/
 http://animaldiversity.ummz.umich.edu/accounts/Otocryptis_nigristigma/classification/
 http://bionames.org/references/0b9566b22557e80128f92af277f0a03c

Otocryptis
Endemic fauna of Sri Lanka
Reptiles of Sri Lanka
Reptiles described in 2005